The BB&T Classic, originally the Franklin National Bank Classic, was a Washington, D.C.-based college basketball event held annually from 1995 to 2017. It raised funds for the Children's Charities Foundation, a fund-raising organization that financially supports Washington, D.C.-area charities, and was staged on or around the first weekend in December. Its name changed in 1999 after BB&T acquired Franklin National Bank that year. Played as a tournament with championship and consolation games from 1995 to 2004, the BB&T Classic was a non-tournament showcase event from 2005 to 2017. A decreasing ability to attract marquee teams and declining fan interest and television coverage led to its demise the 2017 edition.

Founding
Former ambassador and vice-presidential press secretary Peter Teeley and Washington, D.C.-area sportswriter and author John Feinstein organized the Classic in 1995, hoping to raise US$500,000 for the Children's Charities Foundation in the Classic's first year. Abe Pollin, owner of USAir Arena in Landover, Maryland, agreed to host the Classic there, with an initial commitment of three years. In the late 1990s and early 2000s, the BB&T Classic was a legitimate tournament with national attention that attracted powerhouse teams.

Venue
The BB&T Classic originally took place at USAir Arena, later known as USAirways Arena, in Landover, Maryland. After the MCI Center, later known as the Verizon Center and then as Capital One Arena, opened in downtown Washington, D.C., in 1997, the Classic moved there. The event remained there for the rest of its existence.

Format

Tournament, 1995–2004
Originally, the event lasted two days and featured four teams, highlighted by local mainstays Maryland and George Washington, accompanied by two nationally recognized programs.  The first day consisted of a doubleheader pitting each of the local teams against one of the national teams. The following afternoon, a championship game was held between the two opening-round winners. A consolation game between the two teams who lost in the opening round also took place.

Showcase event, 2005–2017
In 2005, the BB&T Classics format was altered due to a declining ability to attract nationally renowned programs, partly because under National Collegiate Athletic Association (NCAA) rules participating teams had to give up two home games in their schedule in order to participate in the tournament. The Classic transformed in 2005 from a tournament into a tripleheader showcase played as a single-evening weeknight event. In 2008 and 2009, it was played as a doubleheader. It returned to the tripleheader format in 2010, but from 2011 through 2014 it was a doubleheader. In 2015, the format again changed, with the Classic consisting of a single game. In 2016 and 2017, the Classic returned to a doubleheader format.

Television coverage
In its early years, the event was broadcast both nationally on ABC and locally on Washington, D.C.'s WDCA. After the Classic changed from a tournament to a showcase event, broadcast television interest in covering it waned, and coverage migrated to cable television. The 2005 and 2006 editions were shown on Comcast SportsNet Mid-Atlantic; in later years MASN televised the BB&T Classic. In 2014, Fox Sports 1 and ESPN3 each carried one game. CBS Sports Network televised the lone game played in 2015. In both 2016 and 2017 Fox Sports 1 televised the Georgetown game, while CBS Sports Network carried the George Washington game in 2016 and MASN televised it in 2017.

Demise
In 2006, the NCAA changed its scheduling rules, allowing colleges to play up to four games in an "exempt" tournament (an in-season tournament whose games counted as only one game in a team′s 27-game schedule) every season, rather than in only two "exempt" tournaments every four years. This made "exempt" tournaments far more popular for major college basketball programs and led to a proliferation of such tournaments. "Non-exempt" events like the BB&T Classic had difficulty attracting major teams in the new scheduling environment because participating schools not only had to give up a home game (and the revenue it generated) to take part in the Classic, but also could not play as many games overall as they could if they played in an exempt tournament. By 2011, with few marquee teams participating, attendance had dwindled dramatically at the Classic, raising doubts about its ability to survive.

The hope of Feinstein and others that the BB&T Classic would serve as showcase for competition among major Washington, D.C.-area college basketball programs was never realized, partly due to cool relations between the local teams and Feinstein's own public criticism of Georgetown for not taking part. The only area team other than George Washington and Maryland to take part in a BB&T Classic tournament was George Mason in 2004 (the tournament format's final year); after that, the Patriots made four showcase-event appearances between 2005 and 2013 before their participation came to and end. Navy made four showcase appearances, all between 2005 and 2010, while American played only in two showcase years and Howard in only one. The closest the BB&T Classic ever came to fulfilling Feinstein's vision of showcasing Washington-area teams was in 2005, the first showcase year, when an all-local lineup of American, George Mason, George Washington, Howard, Maryland, and Navy took part.

Interest in play by the tournament's two stalwarts, Maryland and George Washington, eventually waned. Maryland played in the first 19 BB&T Classic events, but made its last appearance in 2013 – Maryland head coach Mark Turgeon citing a lack of national television coverage, ever-shrinking crowds, and the loss of a home game as reasons for his team to end its relationship with the Classic – leaving George Washington as the only team to play in all 20 BB&T Classics through 2014. By 2014, Feinstein's association with the Classic had come to an end, and with him no longer involved relations between the Classic and Georgetown warmed; that year Georgetown made its first appearance, allowing the Classic to continue to field two major local teams, and the Hoyas took part in the final four editions of the BB&T Classic. However, George Washington did not participate in 2015, leaving Georgetown as the only local participant in what turned out to be a single-game version of the Classic that year. George Washington returned to the Classic in 2016 but then announced that 2017 was its final year of participation.

The final edition of the BB&T Classic took place on December 3, 2017, with a doubleheader in which George Washington defeated Temple and Georgetown beat Coppin State at Capital One Arena before a crowd of only 6,335 for the two games combined. The Classic was quietly discontinued, with little apparent notice of its demise by the press or fans. During its 23-season run, it raised over US$10 million for the Children's Charities Foundation.

Yearly champions, runners-up, and MVPs

Results by school

Brackets 
* – Denotes overtime period

1995

1996

1997

1998

1999

2000

2001

2002

2003

2004

2005 
Showcase Format – No Tournament

2006 
Showcase Format – No Tournament

2007 
Showcase Format – No Tournament

2008 
Showcase Format – No Tournament

2009 
Showcase Format – No Tournament

2010 
Showcase Format – No Tournament

2011 
Showcase Format – No Tournament

2012 
Showcase Format – No Tournament

2013 
Showcase Format – No Tournament

2014 
Showcase Format – No Tournament

2015 
Showcase Format – No Tournament

2016 
Showcase Format – No Tournament

2017 
Showcase Format – No Tournament

References

External links
 Official site

Recurring sporting events established in 1995
Recurring sporting events disestablished in 2017
College men's basketball competitions in the United States
College basketball competitions
George Washington Colonials basketball
Georgetown Hoyas basketball
Men
1995 establishments in Washington, D.C.
2017 disestablishments in Washington, D.C.